Balwa (Nepali: बलवा ) is a municipality in Mahottari District in Province No. 2 of Nepal. It was formed in 2016 occupying current 11 sections (wards) from previous 11 former VDCs. It occupies an area of 44.07 km2 with a total population of 42,341.

References 

Populated places in Mahottari District
Nepal municipalities established in 2017
Municipalities in Madhesh Province